In geometric probability, the problem of Buffon's noodle is a variation on the well-known problem of Buffon's needle, named after Georges-Louis Leclerc, Comte de Buffon who lived in the 18th century. This approach to the problem was published by Joseph-Émile Barbier in 1860.

Buffon's needle

Suppose there exist infinitely many equally spaced parallel lines, and we were to randomly toss a needle whose length is less than or equal to the distance between adjacent lines. What is the probability that the needle will lie across a line upon landing?

To solve this problem, let  be the length of the needle and  be the distance between two adjacent lines. Then, let  be the acute angle the needle makes with the horizontal, and let  be the distance from the center of the needle to the nearest line.

The needle lies across the nearest line if and only if . We see this condition from the right triangle formed by the needle, the nearest line, and the line of length  when the needle lies across the nearest line.

Since , the area of this intersection is given by

 

Now, the area of the sample space is

 

Hence, the probability  of the event is

Bending the needle

The formula stays the same even when the needle is bent in any way (subject to the constraint that it must lie in a plane), making it a "noodle"—a rigid plane curve. We drop the assumption that the length of the noodle is no more than the distance between the parallel lines.

The probability distribution of the number of crossings depends on the shape of the noodle, but the expected number of crossings does not; it depends only on the length L of the noodle and the distance D between the parallel lines (observe that a curved noodle may cross a single line multiple times).

This fact may be proved as follows (see Klain and Rota). First suppose the noodle is piecewise linear, i.e. consists of n straight pieces. Let Xi be the number of times the ith piece crosses one of the parallel lines. These random variables are not independent, but the expectations are still additive due to the linearity of expectation:

Regarding a curved noodle as the limit of a sequence of piecewise linear noodles, we conclude that the expected number of crossings per toss is proportional to the length; it is some constant times the length L. Then the problem is to find the constant. In case the noodle is a circle of diameter equal to the distance D between the parallel lines, then L = D and the number of crossings is exactly 2, with probability 1. So when L = D then the expected number of crossings is 2. Therefore, the expected number of crossings must be 2L/(D).

Barbier's theorem 

In particular, if the noodle is any closed curve of constant width D, then the number of crossings is also exactly 2. This means the perimeter has length , the same as that of a circle, proving Barbier's theorem.

Notes

References

External links
 Interactive math page at Cut-the-Knot website
 Interactive Wolfram CDF demonstration

Integral geometry